Galerina is a genus of small brown-spore saprobic fungi (colloquially often mushrooms), with over 300 species found throughout the world from the far north to remote Macquarie Island in the Southern Ocean. The genus is most noted for some extremely poisonous species which are occasionally confused with hallucinogenic species of Psilocybe. Species are typically small and hygrophanous, with a slender and brittle stem. They are often found growing on wood, and when on the ground have a preference for mossy habitats.

Galerina means helmet-like.

Taxonomic definition
The genus Galerina is defined as small mushrooms of mycenoid stature, that is, roughly similar in form to Mycena species: a small conical to bell-shaped cap, and gills attached to a long and slender cartilaginous stem.  Species have a pileipellis that is a cutis, and ornamented spores that are brown in deposit, where the spore ornamentation comes from an extra spore covering.

Description

Galerina fruiting bodies are typically small, undistinguished mushrooms with a typical "little brown mushroom" morphology and a yellow-brown, light brown to cinnamon-brown spore print. The pileus is typically glabrous and often hygrophanous, and a cortina-type veil is present in young specimens of roughly half of recognized species, though it sometimes disappears as the mushroom ages in many of these species. Microscopically, they are highly variable as well, though most species have spores that are ornamented, lack a germ pore, and have a plage. Many species also have characteristic tibiiform cystidia. However, there are many exceptions, and many species of Galerina lack one or more of these microscopic characteristics. Ecologically, all Galerina are saprobic, growing in habitats like rotting wood or in moss.

The spores of Galerina feature an ornamentation that comes from the outer layer of the spore breaking up on maturity to produce either warts, wrinkles or "ears", flaps of material loosened from where the spore was attached to the basidia.  This outer layer of the spore often is not complete, but has a clear patch in many species just above the attachment, this clear patch is called a plage.  This plage is not evident in all species, and the spore covering does not always breakup in all species, making it sometimes difficult to correctly determine a mushroom of this genus.

The specific features that define the genus require a microscope to confirm.  In the wild it can be difficult to determine a Galerina from a number of similar genera, such as Pholiota, Tubaria, Conocybe, Pholiotina, Agrocybe, Gymnopilus, Phaeogalera and Psilocybe.  For the most part, Galerinas will be found associated with moss, and this can separate out the genus in nature fairly well.  But this identification is more difficult in the section Naucoriopsis, which does not associate with moss, and is a decomposer of wood.

Phaeogalera is a genus that was segregated from Galerina by Robert Kühner.

Phylogenetics
Galerina has recently been found to be polyphyletic, consisting of at least three unrelated clades, although not all species were studied and for most currently recognized species is uncertain still in which they belong.  Each of these clades corresponds to a subgenus of Galerina, as outlined by Kühner. The great diversity of micromorphology found in Galerina is probably due to the polyphyly of the genus.

Toxicity of some species

Many (though not all) Galerina contain alpha-amanitin and other amatoxins.

Galerina marginata (also known as "autumn skullcap", "deadly galerina", etc.) is a poisonous species found throughout the temperate regions of the world, in habitats as diverse as forests and urban parklands, wherever rotting wood is found. DNA studies found that Galerina autumnalis and five other species of Galerina with similar morphologies were, in fact, synonyms of Galerina marginata.

Galerina sulciceps, is a lethal species found in Indonesia and responsible for deaths there. One study found it more toxic than Amanita phalloides.

Galerina steglichii is very rare, bruises blue and contains the hallucinogen psilocybin.

Identification
The extreme toxicity of some Galerina species means that recognition of Galerina is of great importance to mushroom hunters who are seeking hallucinogenic Psilocybe mushrooms.  Species like Galerina marginata may bear a superficial resemblance to Psilocybe cyanescens and other Psilocybe species, and has often been found growing amongst and around Psilocybe cyanescens and other Psilocybe species, making identification all the more confusing to the uninitiated. Galerina can be distinguished from psilocybin Psilocybe by the following characteristics:

Spore print color: blackish-brown to lilac-brown in Psilocybe, light brown to rusty brown in Galerina. Spore color can be seen by taking a spore print or by looking for evidence of spore drop on the stipe or on surrounding mushrooms.
Staining reaction: Psilocybin Psilocybe fruiting bodies stain blue to varying degrees when bruised, while Galerina do not. The strength of this reaction varies with the amount of psilocin present in the tissues of the mushroom. Fruiting bodies with little psilocin (such as Psilocybe semilanceata, with high psilocybin and low psilocin content) will stain weakly if at all, while sporocarps with a high psilocin content will stain strongly blue. Only one rare Galerina has blue-staining tissue, though in some cases the flesh will blacken when handled, and this may be misinterpreted as a bluing reaction.

Although these rules are specific to the separation of Galerina from certain Psilocybe, since mixed patches of Psilocybe and Galerina can occur, it is essential to be sure of the identity of each sporocarp collected.

Galerina also present some risk of confusion with several species of small edible mushrooms, notably Kuehneromyces mutabilis and candy caps (L. camphoratus and allies).

Other notable species
Galerina vittiformis is the type species of the genus Galerina.  This species is common in beds of damp moss (along with many other species of Galerina).  There are a number of variations of this species that have been named over the years:  var. vittiformis f. vittiformis is a 2-spored species; var. vittiformis f. tetrasporis is a 4-spored form; var. pachyspora has been collected on Macquarie Island.

Galerina patagonica has a Gondwanan distribution.  Galerina hypnorum is a widespread species.

Galerina graminea can survive in moss-free grass, unlike many Galerina mushrooms. It was known for many years as 'Galerina laevis', proposed by Christiaan Hendrik Persoon.

Several Galerina species are listed by the US Forest Service as "species of special concern" in the Northwest Forest Plan. These species are considered indicator species for old growth coniferous forest in the Pacific Northwest: Galerina atkinsonia, Galerina cerina, Galerina heterocystis, Galerina sphagnicola, and Galerina vittiformis.

References

Further reading
 
 
 
 Smith AH, Singer R. (1964). A monograph of the genus Galerina Earle. New York: Hafner Publishing Co. 384 p. (Full text available through link)

External links
Fungus of the Month for May 2003: Galerina autumnalis by Tom Volk, TomVolkFungi.net
Norwegian Fungus of the Month May 2001: Galerina pseudomycenopsis Pilát (Archived at the Internet Archive, 2006-05-14.)
Galerina autumnalis MykoWeb.com
Galerina images, MycoSite, University of Oslo, Norway

Poisonous fungi
Deadly fungi
Hymenogastraceae